The 1961 St. Louis Cardinals season was the team's 80th season in St. Louis, Missouri and its 70th season in the National League. The Cardinals went 80–74 during the season and finished fifth in the National League. It was the last season before the NL went to a 162-game schedule the following season to adjust for the new ten-team league.

Offseason 
 October 11, 1960: Leon Wagner, Cal Browning, a player to be named later, and cash were traded by the Cardinals to the Toronto Maple Leafs for Al Cicotte. The Cardinals completed the deal by sending Ellis Burton to the Maple Leafs on January 26, 1961.
 December 29, 1960: Marv Grissom was released by the Cardinals.
 March 15, 1961: Red Schoendienst was signed as a free agent by the Cardinals.
 Prior to 1961 season: Don Taussig was acquired by the Cardinals from the Portland Beavers as part of a minor league working agreement.

Regular season 
On July 6, with the Cardinals at 33–41, manager Solly Hemus was fired and replaced by Johnny Keane. The team went 47–33 under Keane.

First baseman Bill White and third baseman Ken Boyer won Gold Gloves this year.

Season standings

Record vs. opponents

Notable transactions 
 May 10, 1961: Bob Nieman was traded by the Cardinals to the Cleveland Indians for Joe Morgan, a player to be named later, and cash. The Indians sent Mike Lee to the Cardinals on June 1 to complete the trade.
 May 16, 1961: Duke Carmel was traded by the Cardinals to the Los Angeles Dodgers for Joe Koppe.
 May 30, 1961: Daryl Spencer was traded by the Cardinals to the Los Angeles Dodgers for Bob Lillis and Carl Warwick.

Roster

Player stats

Batting

Starters by position 
Note: Pos = Position; G = Games played; AB = At bats; H = Hits; Avg. = Batting average; HR = Home runs; RBI = Runs batted in

Other batters 
Note: G = Games played; AB = At bats; H = Hits; Avg. = Batting average; HR = Home runs; RBI = Runs batted in

Pitching

Starting pitchers 
Note: G = Games pitched; IP = Innings pitched; W = Wins; L = Losses; ERA = Earned run average; SO = Strikeouts

Other pitchers 
Note: G = Games pitched; IP = Innings pitched; W = Wins; L = Losses; ERA = Earned run average; SO = Strikeouts

Relief pitchers 
Note: G = Games pitched; W = Wins; L = Losses; SV = Saves; ERA = Earned run average; SO = Strikeouts

Farm system 

San Juan franchise moved to Charleston (WV), May 19, 1961

References

External links
1961 St. Louis Cardinals at Baseball Reference
1961 St. Louis Cardinals team page at www.baseball-almanac.com

 

St. Louis Cardinals seasons
Saint Louis Cardinals season
St Louis